The 1945 Ohio Bobcats football team was an American football team that represented Ohio University during the 1945 college football season. In 20th their penultimate season under head coach Don Peden, the Bobcats compiled a 3–4 record and were outscored by all opponents by a combined total of 106 to 100.

Schedule

References

Ohio
Ohio Bobcats football seasons
Ohio Bobcats football